Djambala is a district in the Plateaux Region. The district is located in the center of the Republic of the Congo. The capital of Djambala district is the town of Djambala.

Towns and villages

References

Plateaux Department (Republic of the Congo)
Districts of the Republic of the Congo